Bečaje is a small settlement northeast of Begunje pri Cerknici in the Municipality of Cerknica in the Inner Carniola region of Slovenia.

References

External links 

Bečaje on Geopedia

Populated places in the Municipality of Cerknica